The 1881 St Ives by-election was fought on 11 April 1881. The by-election was fought due to the death of the incumbent Liberal MP, Sir Charles Reed.

References

1881 elections in the United Kingdom
1881 in England
April 1881 events
19th century in Cornwall
By-elections to the Parliament of the United Kingdom in Cornish constituencies
St Ives, Cornwall